Burbank is an unincorporated community and a census-designated place (CDP) in Clay County, South Dakota, United States. The population was 93 at the 2020 census. Burbank has been assigned the ZIP Code 57010.

Burbank was laid out in 1873, and named in honor of John A. Burbank, fourth Governor of Dakota Territory.

Demographics

References

Unincorporated communities in Clay County, South Dakota
Unincorporated communities in South Dakota